The following highways are/were numbered 936:

Costa Rica
 National Route 936

Ireland
 R936 regional road

United States